Children in the Israeli–Palestinian conflict refers to the impact of the Israeli–Palestinian conflict on minors in Israel and the Palestinian territories. Laurel Holliday, in her 1999 book Children of Israel/Palestine, writes that two "ethnically distinct peoples – both Palestinians and Israeli Jews – lay claim to the very same sand, stone, rivers, vegetation, seacoast, and mountains" and that the stories she presents show that "Israeli and Palestinian children grow up feeling that they are destined for conflict with their neighbors".

Both the Israeli Defense Forces and militant Palestinian groups have been accused of violating the rights of children and causing injury and death. According to B'tselem's calculations (2021), some 2,171 Palestinian children have been killed in the last two decades by Israeli military actions, and 139 Israeli children have been killed by Palestinian militants.

Joseph Massad has argued that the Western media are far more sensitive to the deaths of Jewish children than to child fatalities among Palestinians. Sarah Honig argues the opposite position, that the international media tolerates murder of Jewish children, particularly settler children. In late April 2015 Human Rights Watch asked the UN to put both Israel and Hamas on its "List of Shame" regarding grave violations of children's rights in a conflict. United Nations Secretary General António Guterres said in 2021: "If there is a hell on earth, it is the lives of children in Gaza today"

History

Youth have been engaged in military action since before the creation of Israel. In the 1929 Hebron massacre, 67 Jews were killed, young children among them; Arab youths initiated the violence by hurling rocks at Jewish students as they walked by. In 1948, adolescent fighters from the Irgun and Lehi paramilitary groups participated in a massacre of 107 Palestinian residents of the village of Deir Yassin, a number of whom were children. Since the Six-Day War, when the West Bank and the Gaza Strip fell under Israeli military occupation, according to Anton Shammas, the idea of 'childhood' was abolished and dropped from Israeli military declarations, so that if a 10-year-old happened to be shot, he was referred to as 'a young man of ten'.

With the outbreak of the First Intifada (1987–1993), stone-throwing was defined as a felony, children began to be arrested with bail set at US$400, and if this was not paid, they could be held in administrative detention for 1 year. The continued Israeli occupation and the stalled Israeli–Palestinian peace process has led to Palestinian protests and political violence, building up to mass protests during the First Intifada. Many youth were involved in nonviolent demonstrations, sit-ins, walk-outs, boycotts, civil disobedience and strikes organized by popular committees. There also was rioting, grenade throwing, and suicide bombings.

J. Kuttab refers to the First Intifada as the "children's revolt" because youth "possessed a new spirit that challenged the occupation" and inspired even adults to action. James L. Gelvin has written that the "paradigmatic symbol" of the First Intifada was "unarmed Palestinian children throwing stones at Israeli tanks." Approximately 90 percent of young males and 80 percent of young females engaged in some form of activism. The much more violent Second Intifada (2000–2005) was led by adults in the Palestine Liberation Organization following the collapse of the 1993 Oslo Accords.

A 2007 survey showed that 17 percent of the Palestinian population is made up of children under the age of five, and 46 percent under 15. In 2012, it was estimated that the densely populated Gaza Strip has a population of 1.7 million, over 800,000 of whom are children.

Rock throwing and firebomb attacks by Palestinians on Israeli residents have been described as regular occurrences in the West Bank, and in many cases they directly affect children. Israelis have recounted incidents in which Palestinians targeted children on school buses, and report that in Hebron they "routinely throw stones at children in the playground". According to the IDF, Arab snipers have fired at cars containing children, and rockets from Gaza have landed in locations that are typically frequented by large numbers of children.

A UN draft report on children in armed conflict, scheduled for publication in mid-June 2015, and prepared by Leila Zerrougui for the Secretary General of the United Nations reportedly recommended adding both Israel and Hamas to the "List of Shame", due to repeated violations of children's rights. Human Rights Watch wrote to Ban Ki-Moon on the 27 April requesting that the names of Israel and Hamas remain on the list, in the context of reports that Israel had been lobbying to have its name removed. Israel denies it has lobbied the UN over this. Inclusion in the list requires that a pattern of multiple instances of repeated abuses of children be evidenced. Human Rights Watch cited in its 2014 report on events in the Israeli–Palestinian conflict over the preceding year, nearly a dozen cases of Palestinian children killed by Israeli security forces, and over 1,200 Palestinian children injured. In addition 41 incidents in which school facilities were damaged, classes interrupted and students injured by IDF forces were registered. Palestinian armed groups, the reports also noted, had launched in the same period some 63 rockets into Israel from Gaza, resulting in disruptions to their schooling of over 12,000 Israeli children.

Terrorist attacks targeting children
Though Israeli children were killed in the conflict during the decades prior, the first acts of Palestinian violence specifically targeting large numbers of Israeli children were committed in the 1970s.

The Avivim school bus massacre was a terrorist attack on an Israeli school bus on May 22, 1970 in which 12 Israeli civilians were killed, nine of them children, and 25 were wounded. The attack took place on the road to Moshav Avivim, near Israel's border with Lebanon. Two bazooka shells were fired at the bus. The attack was one of the first carried out by the PFLP-GC.

The Ma'alot massacre in May 1974 involved a two-day hostage-taking of 115 people which ended in the deaths of over 25 hostages. It began when three armed members of the Democratic Front for the Liberation of Palestine (DFLP) entered the Netiv Meir Elementary School, where they took more than 115 people (including 105 children) hostage on May 15, 1974, in Ma'alot. The hostage-takers soon issued demands for the release of 23 Palestinian militants from Israeli prisons, or else they would kill the students. On the second day of the standoff, a unit of the Golani Brigade stormed the building. During the takeover, the hostage-takers killed the children with grenades and automatic weapons. Ultimately, 25 hostages, including 22 children, were killed and 68 more were injured.

The Dolphinarium discotheque suicide bombing was a terrorist attack by on June 1, 2001 in which a suicide bomber Saeed Hotari, linked to the Palestinian group Hamas, blew himself up outside a discotheque on a beachfront in Tel Aviv, Israel, killing 21 Israeli teenagers and injuring 132.

The Mercaz HaRav massacre, also called the Mercaz HaRav shooting, was an attack that occurred on March 6, 2008, in which a lone Palestinian gunman shot multiple students at the Mercaz HaRav yeshiva, a school in Jerusalem. Eight students and the perpetrator were killed. Eleven more were wounded, five of them placed in serious to critical condition.

Other terrorist attacks targeting children included the Itamar attack in which six children and their parents were murdered in their beds, including a three-month-old infant, and the 2011 Shaar HaNegev school bus attack in which Hamas militants in the Gaza Strip fired a Kornet laser-guided anti-tank missile over the border at an Israeli school bus, killing one child.

Legal issues
In 2010 Palestinian National Authority issued a "Report on the Implementation of the Convention on the Rights of the Child in the Occupied Palestinian Territory", i.e., the West Bank, East Jerusalem and Gaza and noted the Authority's lack of jurisdiction over these areas and the Israel "closure regime", the "Israeli Wall of Annexation and Expansion" and the many checkpoints Israel has set up within the occupied territories. All make it difficult for Palestinians to stop Israeli violations of the rights of Palestinian children.

According to the Israeli military and prison service, at the end of February 2018 there were 356 Palestinian minors (defined as before 18th birthday) held as Israeli security detainees and prisoners.

Applicable to Israelis and Palestinians is the Convention on the Rights of the Child, a human rights treaty setting out the civil, political, economic, social, health and cultural rights of children. The Convention defines a child as any human being under the age of eighteen, unless the state itself defines the age of majority as an earlier age. Israel ratified the Convention on the Rights of the Child in 1991. Although Palestine did not have the status of a state, in 1995 Yassir Arafat, as the representative of the Palestine Liberation Organization, signed the Convention. The internationally accepted definition of children, codified in the United Nations Convention on the Rights of the Child (CRC), defines children as individuals under the age of 18. Since 1991 Israel has signed and ratified the CRC and applies the definition to Israeli children. However, in the Occupied Territories Israel defines as minors only Palestinians who are under the age of 16. Some leaders of the major Palestinian armed groups also state they consider children of 16 to be adults. According to the 1971 Israeli Youth Law, criminal responsibility is set at 12 years of age and over. The law states that children under that age may not be arrested, and that children older than that age must not be interrogated unless their parents and their lawyer is present. The Israeli human rights monitoring group B'Tselem states that the law does not officially apply to Palestinian children in the Occupied Territories, who are subject to Israeli military law, but that the military court has recommended the provisions should be taken into consideration. According to Gideon Levy, these provisions are ignored in practice. A UNICEF report has stated that, "Ill-treatment of Palestinian children in the Israeli military detention system appears to be widespread, systematic and institutionalized," and that, "In no other country are children systematically tried by juvenile military courts."

Treatment of Palestinian children by the IDF
The Code of Conduct of the Israeli Defense Forces explicitly prohibits targeting non-combatants and dictates proportional force, stating, in part, that "The soldier shall make use of his weaponry and power only for the fulfillment of the mission and solely to the extent required; he will maintain his humanity even in combat. The soldier shall not employ his weaponry and power in order to harm non-combatants or prisoners of war, and shall do all he can to avoid harming their lives, body, honor and property." However, Philip E. Veerman in an academic study found that the reaction of Israeli police and military against Palestinian violence was so strong that it "practically eliminates the chances of effective training directed at the protection of children." Many children are raised in refugee camps, and their situation has been described by Daoud Kuttub in the following way:
'Unlike children in refugee camps elsewhere, children born in refugee camps under occupation drink their mothers' milk while their camp is under curfew; they wake up in the middle of the night to the sound of rubber bullets and rumors of a possible settler attack. As they grow up, they quickly learn the political lesson of the occupation. Soldiers, batons, tear gas, rubber bullets, arrests, torture, curfews, closure of camp entrances, administrative detention, and town arrests are all prominent entries in the refugee camps' daily dictionary.'

Violence against children
Each year approximately 700 Palestinian children aged 12 to 17, the great majority of them boys, are arrested, interrogated and detained by Israeli army, police and security agents.

An estimated 7,000 children have been detained , interrogated, prosecuted and/or imprisoned within the Israeli military justice system – an average of two children each day. Israel, after it emerged that even 12-year-old children were prosecuted in adult military courts, instituted in September 2009 a juvenile military court, the only one known to exist in the world, which however uses the same staff and rooms as the military courts where Palestinian adults are put on trial. Two years later (27 September 2011) Military Order 1676 stipulated that only youths 18 and over could be tried in adult military courts. However the sentencing protocols applied to the 16–17 year old bracket remain those applied to adults. Most prosecutions of teenagers concern stone-throwing which is an offence under Section 212 of Military Order 1651, and carried a penalty of up to 10 years imprisonment, theoretically applicable to children between 14 and 15. Conviction for throwing anything at a moving vehicle with intent to harm carries a maximum penalty of 20 years.

The analysis of cases monitored by UNICEF identified examples of practices that amount to cruel, inhuman or degrading treatment or punishment according to the Convention on the Rights of the Child (ratified by Israel in 1991 and the PA in 1995) and the Convention against Torture. It is common for many children caught up in the system to be aggressively woken in the middle of the night by many armed soldiers and, tied and blindfolded, transported to Israeli settlements or official interrogation centres. Few children are informed of their rights to legal counsel, or their right to avoid self-incrimination. Confessions from children are extracted by a mixture of sleep-deprivation, threats –of death threats against them or their families, sexual assault and solitary confinement- and physical violence. Confessions to be signed are often written in Hebrew, which most Palestinian children do not know. Once the interrogation is finished, the children, in leg chains, shackles and prison uniforms, are taken before a military court where their confessions, extorted under duress, form the primary evidence for the prosecution. Sentences are served in three prisons, two of which are inside Israel, and critics argue that their incarceration in Israel violates the article 76 of the Geneva Convention, which states that "protected persons accused of offences shall be detained in the occupied country, and if convicted they shall serve their sentences therein."

According to John Dugard, the UN Special Rapporteur, regarding the early years of the Al-Aqsa Intifada (2000-2002), most child victims were not participating in demonstrations when they were killed by tank shelling, artillery fire and helicopter gunships.  Since the Second Intifada, UNICEF (The United Nations Children's Fund), Amnesty International, B'Tselem and individuals such as the British writer Derek Summerfield, have called for Israel to protect children from violence in accordance with the Geneva conventions. The European Union has linked the suspension of Israel/Europe trade agreement talks to human rights issues, especially in regards to children.

In 2012, Breaking the Silence, an organization founded by former Israeli soldiers whose purpose is to expose alleged abuses committed by the Israeli Defense Forces released a booklet of witness reports written by more than 30 former Israeli soldiers. These reports document of Palestinian children being beaten, intimidated, humiliated, verbally abused and injured by Israeli soldiers. Eran Efrati, a former IDF commander on the West Bank has said that ill-treatment of arrested children is routine. He himself admits to having arrested children aged 11 and over as though they were adults, with handcuffs and blindfolds:
'When the kid is sitting there in the base, I didn't do it, but nobody is thinking of him as a kid, you know—if there is someone blindfolded and handcuffed, he's probably done something really bad. It's OK to slap him, it's OK to spit on him, it's OK to kick him sometimes. It doesn't really matter.'
700 of the 9,000 Palestinians arrested in 2013 were children. An Israeli Defense Forces spokesperson said the Breaking the Silence group had declined to provide the IDF with testimonies for verification, and Danny Lamm, president of the Executive Council of Australian Jewry, said these types of testimonies are "anonymous ... devoid of critical detail and untested by any kind of cross-questioning."

Between 2014 and 2015, the military prosecuted indictments against 1,046 Palestinian minors. The non-governmental organization, Euro-Mediterranean Human Rights Monitor, Accuse the Israeli forces of orchestring "their actions" to "humiliate and terrorize Palestinian children".

Child detention
In September 2009, after documentation emerged showing Palestinians children as young as 12 were prosecuted in adult military courts, Israel established a juvenile military court, 'the first and only juvenile military court in operation in the world.' Military Order 1651 establishes a maximum 6 months sentence for children aged 12–13, and 12 months for juniors aged 14–15, unless the offence involves throwing stones at persons or property with the intent to damage, in which case 10 years imprisonment is the maximum penalty.

In one case a 5-year-old child has been detailed on allegations he threw stones in Hebron. The IDF said that the boy had endangered passers-by and that soldiers only accompanied him to his parents. It stated that the child was not arrested and no charges were filed.

A separate study, conducted from 2005 until 2010 was released in mid-2011 by the Jerusalem-based non-profit B'Tselem, found that the actions of the IDF potentially violated the Convention on the Rights of the Child and the Fourth Geneva Convention.

According to a March 2013 report by the United Nations Children's Fund ("UNICEF"), Israel has arrested some 7,000 Palestinian children; 18 of 27 arrested in Hebron in March 2013 were below the age of 12. The report was based on 400 cases documented since 2009. It stated that the Palestinian children who are detained by the Israeli military are subjected to "widespread, systematic and institutionalized" ill treatment in violation of international law. UNICEF estimated that in the West Bank IDF and Israeli security services annually arrest around 700 youths between 12 and 17 years old.  The report supported claims that the arrests were often made, without notice, in private homes at night. It reports that children are blindfolded, painfully restrained, and subjected to physical and verbal abuse while being detained, sometimes in solitary confinement.

The report further claims that, once in detention, they are interrogated and coerced into confession, without immediate access to a legal counsel or family members. Signed confessions are typically typed in Hebrew, which few Palestinian minors can read. As of January 2013 Israeli military prisons held 233 males under 18, 31 under the age of 16. Additionally children are shackled during court appearances and made to serve sentences in Israel. UNICEF stated these findings "amount to cruel, inhuman or degrading treatment or punishment according to the Convention on the Rights of the Child and the Convention against Torture".

About 60 percent of arrested minors are charged with throwing rocks at soldiers or passing cars, which the IDF regards as a form of terrorism as it has led to the death and injury of Israelis, including of children.

The UNICEF report noted that Israel had made some positive changes over recent years, such as hand tying measures that do not cause pain or injury. It urged Israel to refrain from blindfolding minors and holding them in solitary confinement, to permit an attorney or family member to attend interrogations, and to record interrogations to document any false claims of abuse. Israel's Foreign Ministry said Israel's military was already making changes to cooperate with the United Nations, including reducing holding time before seeing a judge to 48 hours, telling parents about arrest of children, and informing children of their right to consult a lawyer. UNICEF replied that the changes were insufficiently specific. Israeli Ministry spokesman Yigal Palmor stated that "Israel will study the conclusions and will work to implement them through ongoing cooperation with UNICEF, whose work we value and respect". In October,2013 UNICEF reported that the IDF was introducing changes in its arrest of minors in a pilot-test programme, but according to Haaretz the policy had not at that date been implemented and was still under study.

January 2015, Euro-Mediterranean Human Rights Monitor has issued a press release about Israeli detention of a Palestinian girl. The monitor said that Malak Al-Khatib, 14 year old-Palestinian girl, has been imprisoned by Israeli authorities for 22 consecutive days without contact with her parents, and has just been sentenced to serve another month along with a stiff fine on her parents. In addition, the monitor said that another four children as young as 11 were recently held for four hours under threat of detention and death. The Euro-Med Monitor has condemned Israel's policy of detaining children and subjecting them to abusive and inhumane treatment.

Human shields
Amnesty International's report into the 2008 Gaza War stated that they had found instances in which the IDF endangered the lives of civilians, including children, by using them as human shields. The report discussed examples such as "forcing them to remain in or near houses which they took over and used as military positions. Some were forced to carry out dangerous tasks such as inspecting properties or objects suspected of being booby-trapped." The Israeli military denied the allegations saying "The IDF operated in accordance with the rules of war and did the utmost to minimize harm to civilians uninvolved in combat. The IDF's use of weapons conforms to international law." Israel's Intelligence and Terrorism Information Center and the Israeli Ministry of Foreign Affairs likewise accused Hamas and other militant groups of using children human shields during the Gaza war.

In 2010, two IDF soldiers were convicted of 'excess authority' and 'conduct unbecoming' for using a 9-year-old Palestinian child as a human shield to open packages they suspected of being booby trapped during the Gaza War. Both soldiers received three months probation and a demotion in rank. The Israeli Deputy Military Advocate for Operational Affairs commented that "the defendants did not seek to humiliate or degrade the boy."

Settler violence

Palestinian militant misuse of children
Historically, in the final years of the Ottoman Empire, Palestinian children and youths often figured at the forefront of struggles to oppose Jewish immigration into Palestine.  According to David M. Rosen, from the beginning of the conflict, the belief developed among militants that youth have a duty to sacrifice themselves. With the emergence of Fatah in the Palestinian diaspora, the PLO created youth groups like the Zahrat (flowers) for girls and Ashbal (lion cubs) for boys in communities of exiled Palestinians. The aim was to provide them with military training as part of a programme to strength a Palestinian national self-awareness within the context of a revolutionary culture.

When the First Intifada  broke out, a culture of linking the  Palestinian stone-throwing child to a shahid quickly developed. In the five years running up to the outbreak of the Second Intifada, the Palestinian Authority created 19 paramilitary training camps for teenagers. The drills include mock kidnappings of Israeli political figures, attacks on military posts and training  with Kalashnikovs. Testimonies from young people highlighted an agenda of radicalization. Shaul Kimhi and Shmuel Even, writing of events down to 2003, have argued that children and youths who engage in terrorist acts form part of a fourth category by motivation, which they define as "the exploited".

In October 2000, the Grand Mufti Ekrima Sa'id Sabri incited child suicide bombers when questioned about suicide attacks, he declared: “The younger the martyr, the more I respect him”. The participation of children in acts of violence intensified during the second Intifada, as many children were recruited into Palestinian armed groups. Daphne Burdman (2003) describes a process in which young people were encouraged to die as martyrs through incitement of the Palestinian educational system. 

According to the Coalition to Stop the Use of Child Soldiers' "2004 Global Report on the Use of Child Soldiers" there was "no evidence of systematic recruitment of children by Palestinian armed groups."  The report noted that "children are used as messengers and couriers, and in some cases as fighters and suicide bombers in attacks on Israeli soldiers and civilians. All the main political groups involve children in this way, including Fatah, Hamas, Islamic Jihad, and the Popular Front for the Liberation of Palestine." In total, there were at least 9 incidents where children were involved in suicide attacks or other violent militant acts.

According to Human Rights Watch, in 2004, the major Palestinian armed groups, including Al-Aqsa Martyrs Brigade, the Popular Front for the Liberation of Palestine, Islamic Jihad, and Hamas "have publicly disavowed the use of children in military operations, but those stated policies have not always been implemented." In part this is because some leaders state they consider children of 16 to be adults. In 2005 Amnesty International condemned the use of children by Palestinian militant groups saying: "Palestinian armed groups have repeatedly shown total disregard for the most fundamental human rights, notably the right to life, by deliberately targeting Israeli civilians and by using Palestinian children in armed attacks."

Human shields
During the Second Intifada (2000–2005) Haaretz reported that Palestinian militant gunmen used civilians and children as human shields by surrounding themselves with children while shooting at IDF forces.

In a 2006 incident the Israeli Air Force warned Mohammed Weil Baroud, a Palestinian leader accused by Israel of firing Qassam rockets at Israel, to evacuate his home in Beit Lahia in the Gaza Strip in advance of an Israeli airstrike. Instead, hundreds of Palestinians, including many women and children, gathered outside Baroud's house. Israel suspended the airstrike out of fear that the civilians would be killed or injured. A senior Hamas official said the new tactic was taken because in previous months Israel has destroyed 58 houses and more than 240 people had been left homeless. After Israel called off the strike, another Palestinian leader said: "We have won. From now on we will form human chains around every house that is threatened with demolition."

In October 2009, local Palestinians confirmed that Hamas had fired at Israeli troops from adjacent a UN school for girls where hundreds of Palestinians had sought refuge, leading to civilian casualties.

During the November 2012 Operation Pillar of Defense, Hamas was accused of launching rockets from hospitals, schools, mosques and playgrounds. This practice was condemned by Human Rights Watch, the UN Office of the High Commissioner for Human Rights (OHCHR), and the IDF.

Child suicide bombers

According to the Coalition to Stop the Use of Child Soldiers "2004 Global Report on the Use of Child Soldiers", there were at least nine documented suicide attacks involving Palestinian minors between October 2000 and March 2004.

In 2004, The Guardian reported that the Israeli military "accused a faction of Yasser Arafat's Fatah movement of using an 11-year-old boy as an unwitting human bomb after the child was discovered carrying explosive through an army checkpoint in Nablus. In 2009, a 14-year-old was captured by Israeli soldiers and told of being given $23 and a suicide bomber's vest. His family said he was gullible and easily manipulated.

Shafiq Masalha, a clinical psychologist who teaches at Tel Aviv University, wrote in 2004 that 15 percent of Palestinian children dreamt of becoming suicide bombers. According to Eyad Sarraj, Palestinian psychiatrist and director of the Gaza Community Mental Health Program, a survey by his program found that 36 percent of Palestinians over 12 aspired to die "a martyr's death" fighting Israel.

Former UN Under-Secretary General Olara Otunnu stated in 2003: "We have witnessed both ends of these acts: children have been used as suicide bombers and children have been killed by suicide bombings. I call on the Palestinian authorities to do everything within their powers to stop all participation by children in this conflict."

Casualty figures

Below is a summary of tables of child fatalities from 1987 to 2022 presented by B'Tselem. It provides an overview of killings of Israeli children by Palestinian militants and of Palestinian children, largely by Israeli security forces. Per the below, the Israeli government disputes some of these numbers, especially regarding the Gaza War.

The First Intifada of mass protests and rioting by Palestinians in the occupied West Bank, East Jerusalem and Gaza started in 1987, and children frequently participated. In an article in the London Review of Books, American professors John Mearsheimer and Stephen Walt claimed that the Israel Defense Forces ("IDF") encouraged troops to break protesters' bones. The Swedish branch of Save the Children estimated that during the first year of the intifada, between 23,600 and 29,900 children required medical treatment for such beating, tear gas, and gunfire injuries and that nearly a third were under the age of ten. The Israel Ministry of Foreign Affairs lists 24 Israeli child fatalities between 1993 and 1999.

As the B'Tselem summaries show, from the outbreak of the Second Intifada starting in 2000, through the 2008–2009 Gaza War, to September 2012 there were a greater number of child fatalities. A study by the International Institute for Counter-Terrorism covering September 2001 to January 2005 found that 46 Israelis and 88 Palestinians were below the age of 12 at the time of their deaths. The youngest victim of violence during the Second Intifada was an Israeli infant who was nine hours old at the time of his death. During the 2004–2009 period there were reports of 30 or more Palestinian children and infants dying, including as a result of miscarriage, at Israeli checkpoints where they were held for long periods of time and denied medical care. Additionally, suicide bombings and other attacks have caused Israeli women to suffer miscarriages, and numerous pregnant women have been killed.

Casualties after the three-week Gaza War during the winter of 2008–2009 were disputed. B'Tselem put out a report stating that 320 Palestinian minors under the age of 18 who did not take part in hostilities had been killed by Israeli forces. It was unknown if six other dead children took part, but 19 children between the ages of 16 and 18 who did so also were killed. Defence for Children International reported that 352 children had died as a direct result of Israeli military action. The Palestinian Centre for Human Rights found that 318 Palestinian children been killed. Al Mezan Center for Human Rights found that 355 Gazan children were killed by Israeli forces. According to Amnesty international the Palestinian fatalities included "some 300" children. The Israeli military later released its own figures, stating only 89 children under the age of 16 died. According to Elihu D. Richter and Yael Stein of Hebrew University B'Tselem data showed that the overwhelming majority of Palestinian child deaths were male teenagers, suggesting many could have had some role in combat or support for combat.

Studies conducted by Israel's International Institute for Counter-Terrorism indicate that 96 percent of Palestinian fatalities during the Second Intifada were male and that the vast majority of child casualties were teenagers. Israeli fatalities do not show any great inclination in regards to gender or age.

The United Nations Office for the Coordination of Humanitarian Affairs reported that during "Operation Pillar of Defense", the November 2012 Gaza-Israel clashes, 30 Palestinian children were killed.

Israeli children

About 70 percent of the Israeli children hit were killed in Palestinian suicide bombings. Others were killed in shootings and attacks on cars and buses. In addition, several rapes, kidnappings, and individual murders of Israeli children and teenagers have occurred. Other Israeli children were killed in home invasions, some of them in their own beds or their parents' beds.

According to Amnesty International, between 2000 and 2004 during the First Intifada "more than 100 Israeli children... [were] killed and hundreds of others injured in suicide bombings, shootings and other attacks carried out by Palestinian armed groups in Israel and in the Occupied Territories."

Examples include:
 In 2001, a Palestinian sniper opened fire on the Avraham Avino settlement in Hebron from the Palestinian-controlled Abu Sneineh neighborhood. Ten month-old Shalhevet Pass was shot in the head and killed while sitting in her stroller; her father was wounded. Israeli leaders said that the sniper deliberately aimed for the baby.
 The Sbarro restaurant massacre in August 2001 killed 15 Israelis, among them 7 children and a pregnant woman.
 The Yeshivat Beit Yisrael massacre on March 2, 2002, targeting a group of women and children next to a synagogue, resulted in the deaths of seven children and four adults. Eight of the dead came from the same family.
 The 2004 Murder of Tali Hatuel and her four daughters, in which Palestinian militants killed Tali Hatuel, who was eight months pregnant along with her four daughters: Hila (11), Hadar (9), Roni (7) and Merav (2). After shooting at the vehicle in which Hatuel was driving with her daughters, witnesses said the militants approached the vehicle and shot the occupants repeatedly at close range. An alliance of Islamic Jihad and the Popular Resistance Committees claimed responsibility for the attack.

Israel Ministry of Foreign Affairs reports that 8,341 Israelis were injured as a direct result of the conflict between 2001 and 2007 but does not specify how many were minors. Frequent rocket fire has also caused many injuries in the post-Intifada period. Permanent disability among children has resulted, including blindness, paralysis, brain damage, and loss of limbs. A 2003 study by Schneider Children's Medical Center of Israel concluded, "Analysis of the injuries sustained by the 160 children hospitalized after these events indicates that most were caused by blasts and penetration by foreign objects. Sixty-five percent of the children had multiple injuries, and the proportion of critical to fatal injuries was high (18%)."

The rate of Israeli casualties in total declined following the construction of the West Bank Barrier; suicide bombing rates fell as potential bombers were thwarted before entering into Israeli territory.

Palestinian children

The first recorded incident of Israel Defense Forces killing Palestinian children was in November 1950 when three Palestinian children from the village of Yalo aged 8, 10 and 12, were shot near Dayr Ayyub in the Latrun salient.  According to adult witnesses, "only one man fired at them with a sten-gun but none of the detachment attempted to interfere." In February 1953, one of five Arab shepherds shot in al-Burj was 13 years old. During the 1952 Beit Jala raid, 4 children ranging in age from 6 to 14 were killed by machine gun fire.

According to Amira Hass, 54 minors were brought to UNRWA clinics with head wounds from August 1989 to August 1993. The Association of Israeli and Palestinian Physicians for Human Rights (PHR-Israel) estimates that a child under the age of six was shot in the head every two weeks during the First Intifada.

According to the Defence for Children International (DCI), of the "595 children killed [29 September 2000 to 30 June 2004] during the Second Intifada, 383, or 64.4%, died as a result of Israeli air and ground attacks, during assassination attempts, or when Israeli soldiers opened fire randomly" and "212 children, or 35.6%, died as a result of injuries sustained during clashes with Israeli military forces". The DCI estimates that from January 1, 2001 until May 1, 2003, at least 4,816 Palestinian children were injured, with the majority of injuries resulting from Israeli army activity while the children were going about their normal activities.

Amnesty International accused Israeli forces of inadequately investigating killings of children during the Second Intifada Intifada, while also condemning the killings of Israeli children by suicide bombings and other attacks by Palestinians.

During Gaza War, a three-week armed conflict in the Gaza Strip between Israel and Palestinian militants during the winter of 2008–2009, an "unprecedented" number of children were killed or injured, according to the Palestinian Centre for Human Rights which listed 313 killed. The Israel Defense Forces said that 89 "non-combatants" under the age of 18 died. B'Tselem reported that 318 minors below the age of 18 were killed. B'Tselem's numbers were disputed. When the United Nations attempted an investigation of high civilian deaths as a possible war crime, Israelis refused to co-operate.

During the November 2012 Israel-Gaza clashes, 30 children reportedly were killed.

Other examples of casualties include:
 Killing of 12-year-old Muhammad al-Durrah in September 2000 as his father tried to shield him from bullets became a defining image of the Second Intifada, and was compared to other iconic images of children under attack such as the boy in the Warsaw ghetto (1943).
 In November 2000, 14-year-old Faris Odeh was shot and killed while clashing with Israeli troops at the Karni crossing.
 In 2001, an 11-year-old boy, Khalil al-Mughrabi, was killed by tank fire, and two others were injured. Al-Mughrabi had been playing football in a field a half-mile away.
 During the 2007 assassination of Salah Shahade, a member of Hamas, several civilians were killed, including 8 children.
 In December 2008 two Palestinian school girls were killed in Gaza when a Qassam rocket launched by militants fell short of its Israeli target and into a house.

Foreign children

 Aleksei Lupalu, 16, of Ukraine was killed in the Dolphinarium discotheque suicide bombing on June 2, 2001 along with 20 other civilians. Hamas claimed responsibility.
 Shmuel Taubenfeld, 3 months, of New Square, New York was killed in the Shmuel HaNavi bus bombing on August 19, 2003 along with 22 other civilians, of whom 2 were foreign citizens. Over 130 were injured, and 7 fatalities were children. Both Hamas and Islamic Jihad claimed responsibility.
 Daniel Wultz, aged 16, of Weston, Florida, USA, was killed in the 2006 Tel Aviv shawarma restaurant bombing. 10 other civilians were killed, of whom 7 were Israeli and 3 were from other countries, and over 70 were injured. Islamic Jihad claimed responsibility.
 In March 2012, a French Muslim attacked the Ozar Hatorah Jewish day school, later stating he did it to avenge Palestinians. He shot and killed a Rabbi who taught there and his two sons, Aryeh, aged 6, and Gabriel, aged 3, as well as 8-year-old Miriam Monsonego and severely injured 17-year-old Bryan Bijaoui.

Effects on children

Child indoctrination
A comprehensive three-year study (2009–2012) of Israeli and Palestinian textbooks, regarded by its researchers as "the most definitive and balanced study to date on the topic," found that incitement, demonization or negative depictions of the other in children's education was "extremely rare" in both Israeli and Palestinian school texts, with only 6 instances discovered in over 9,964 pages of Palestinian textbooks, none of which consisted of "general dehumanising characterisations of personal traits of Jews or Israelis". Israeli officials rejected the study as biased, while Palestinian Authority officials claimed it vindicated their view that their textbooks are as fair and balanced as Israel's.

The study, published in 2013 by the Council for Religious Institutions in the Holy Land, an interfaith association of Jewish, Christian, and Muslim leaders in Israel, the West Bank, and Gaza, produced different results. The study was supervised by a psychiatrist, Prof. emeritus Bruce Wexler of Yale University and his NGO, A Different Future, and a joint Palestinian-Israeli research team, headed by Professors Daniel Bar-Tal (Tel Aviv University) and Sami Adwan (Bethlehem University), was commissioned. Six Israeli and four Palestinian bilingual research assistants were employed to analyze the texts of 370 Israeli and 102 Palestinian books from grades 1 to 12. The study found that, while most schoolbooks on either side were factually accurate, both Israel and the Palestinians failed to adequately and positively represent each other, and presented "exclusive unilateral national narratives". It was found that 40 percent of Israeli and 15 percent of Palestinian textbooks were judged to contain neutral depictions of the other, whereas negative characterizations were discerned in 26 percent of Israeli state school books and 50 percent of the Palestinian ones. Israeli schoolbooks were deemed superior to Palestinian ones with regard to preparing children for peace, but the study praised both Israel and the Palestinian Authority for producing textbooks almost completely unblemished by "dehumanizing and demonizing characterizations of the other".

In 2006 the Anti-Defamation League wrote that Hamas' four-year-old bi-weekly on-line magazine for children, al-Fatah (Arabic for "the conqueror"), featured stories and columns praising suicide bombers and attacks against the "Jewish enemy." In 2009 Hamas refused to allow Palestinian children to learn about the Holocaust, which it called "a lie invented by the Zionists" and referred to Holocaust education as a "war crime."

More than 37,000 Palestinian boys, aged 15–17, took part in a Hamas youth training program during the 2012–13 academic year, which has become part of the official state educational curriculum since September 2012. Its purpose is to "initiate a new generation of Palestinian men in the struggle against Israel" and included fighting skills, firing a rifle and first aid. The program includes contributions by the al-Qassam Brigades.

In early 2013 more than 3,000 Palestinian teenagers graduated from Hamas's first high school military training program in the Gaza Strip. Hamas officials said the program, which is an elective course, is aimed at creating a new generation of leaders to struggle against Israel. According to Abu Hozifa, a 29-year-old national security officer who teaches in the program, children are taught to "honor the national flag and anthem, to strengthen their affinity with the homeland and Jerusalem, the spirit of resistance and the principles of steadfastness. We also prepare them in terms of faith and physical fitness to serve as resistance fighters if they want to be in the future."

Hamas also runs a two-week camp for 5,000 boys at a Hamas military base. The boys are dressed in military-style uniforms and trained by members of the Hamas National Guard and militants from Hamas' armed wing, the al-Qassam Brigades. They learn karate, street-fighting, and how to throw a hand grenade.

In 2000, 25,000 Palestinian teenagers learned "kidnapping, ambushing and using assault weapons" at a summer camp run by Yassir Arafat's staff who deal with psychological warfare. Lt. General Shaul Mofaz, the IDF's Chief of the General Staff, regarded the camps as "evidence of the risks of a new Palestinian upheaval". The Arafat aide who oversees the camps compared the camps to the Israeli Gadna corps for teenagers and said "We hope that we will achieve our rights through negotiations, so that summer camps like these will cease to exist. ... There is nothing we want more than a full and genuine peace, including Jerusalem, which would allow us to end the weapons-training and concentrate instead on teaching our young people about computers, and swimming and other recreations."

In 2015, a children performed a song at a kindergarten graduation ceremony in the West Bank which included these lyrics: "If you stretch your hand, it will be chopped off. If you just look with your eye, it will be gouged out. ... We come for you before, and woe betide you if we come back again. You come to this land alive, but you will leave it as body part." Yasser Arafat's image accompanied the children on stage as they carried toy guns and wore uniforms. A woman's charity sponsored the ceremony.

Israel education has presented military service as the primary goal of boys and girls from elementary school to high school. As an example of the Army's central role, Israeli children are encouraged to write letters to Israeli soldiers. In 2010 the IDF announced that as a result of recruitment problems it would introduce "Mobile Draft Offices" to visit 700 schools a year to making Israeli teenagers enthusiastic about military service; it also has started text messaging, online chats and other means to contact youth before they are conscripted. In 1999 a member of the Israeli anti-draft group New Profile said about Israel's "military values" that "Children are indoctrinated throughout their whole lives and they're not given a chance to choose." The group promotes Profile 21 disability exemptions or explicit conscientious objection as means to avoid service. Israel does prosecute and jail conscientious objectors.

Dr. Nurit Peled-Elhanan, of the Tel Aviv University School of Education has said the Gadna military program for high school students "makes it clear, in no uncertain terms, at the supreme value is the state, and that the norms are established by the state and the army, whatever they may be ... there is no room for hesitation, for criticism or any signs of these. All, including the parents, must contribute to the effort of conscription." Hebrew University Professor Matanya Ben Artzi, whose son was arrested for resisting conscription, said "This is a takeover by the army of the high school, that is meant to be the foundation for a civil society." Education Minister Yuli Tamir said "We educate the pupils to civil and social commitment to the state, which includes military service. If the IDF is helping us encourage this outlook of commitment, then I will support the program."

According to Michael Kaplan and Gideon Levy, during a weapons display held on Israel's 66th Independence Day in Efrat, numerous photos showed Israeli children dressed in military attire and holding weapons. According to Kaplan, this indicates that not only Palestinian, but groups of Israeli children 'learn to glory violence and aspire towards violence'.

Israeli Professor Edward Kaufman has written that Israel's faith in military superiority, its use of "extra-judicial executions" or "targeted elimination" of suspects that often result in deaths of innocents, has exacerbated the conflict. He writes it has resulted in the fact that "Israeli schoolchildren are among the most violent in the world, a phenomenon believed to be the result of force being an accepted societal means of dispute resolution. An astonishing 43 percent of Israeli children have admitted to bullying others, while one in four Israeli boys admitted to carrying a knife to school for protection. It is only to be expected that Israel's use of overwhelming force to deal with the Palestinians has had a trickle-down effect on society. The culture of violence prevalent in Israel has had a dramatic impact on the most impressionable members of the community: children."

In 2012, a joint study of Palestinian, Jewish-Israeli and Arab-Israeli children found that exposure to political conflict and violence contributed to an increase in aggressive behavior. According to the study, "Palestinian children were at the greatest risk for exposure to violence across settings as well as at the highest level of aggressive behavior in comparison to the two other groups. Males were uniformly at greater risk than were females for all forms of exposure to violence as well as more aggressive."

Gadna program

Gadna is an Israeli pre-army military program to prepare high school students for their mandatory service. Gadna was created before the Israeli declaration of independence. During the 1948 Arab–Israeli War, trainees served as combatants. Until 1990, Gadna focused on instilling patriotic values in Israeli youth and encouraging immigration of youth to Israel. Nowadays, the program concentrates on increasing motivation to serve in the Army. As of 2007, an estimated minority of 16,000 to 19,000 11th grade pupils annually engage in squad-sized operations, night treks and shooting, with the promise of rewards for excellence when the youth join the Israel Defense Forces. Educators have criticized the program as "overly militaristic". The one-week-long program was revised in 2007 to include lessons in combat doctrine, the purity of arms and ethics in combat.

Schooling disruptions

Schooling has been disrupted for both Israeli and Palestinian children. Israeli children at or on the way to school have been killed by Palestinian militants, as in the 1970 Avivim school bus massacre that killed 9 children and injured 25, the 1974 Ma'alot massacre which resulted in the death of 22 elementary school children, the 1992 murder of Helena Rapp, the 1997 Island of Peace massacre where 7 school girls on a class field trip were shot and killed, the 2002 killing of 3 teenagers at the Hitzim yeshiva high school in Itamar, and the 2008 Mercaz HaRav massacre resulting in 8 children killed and 11 injured.

Schools throughout southern Israel are closed when rocket fire from Gaza becomes intense, including those in major cities such as Beersheba and Ashdod. Israeli authorities have reported incidents in which schools were damaged and school buses destroyed by Qassam rockets and mortars.

Israel has closed schools in the West Bank for months during periods of conflict. In 1989 200,000 students were kept out of class from January to July. During Israeli curfews imposed during 2002 teachers and students created makeshift schools in halls, living rooms and alleys so students would not have to travel by car or bus to get to schools. Israel's separation barrier has separated some students from their schools, leading to long waits at checkpoints. In 2008 Israel closed two charity schools for needy children because Israel suspected they were tied to Hamas. Schools in Gaza also close during clashes, as during the November 2012 Operation Pillar of Defense.

Israeli weapon strikes in Gaza have destroyed or damaged Palestinian schools. Ninety-three schools were shelled in 2000–2001. During the three-week Gaza War Israeli airstrikes destroyed 18 schools and damaged 280, including United Nations Relief and Works Agency schools. Israel's blockade of the Gaza Strip prohibited import of school supplies and school construction materials into Gaza. In 2011, after months of negotiations, Israel allowed in enough material to build 18 new schools.

Settlers also have disrupted schooling of children. In 2002 there was one attempted and two actual bombings of Palestinian schools by Jewish vigilante groups. In 2011 United Nations Special Rapporteur Richard A. Falk said that many Palestinian children have stopped attending school because of frequent settler harassment.

Medical care

Israeli

Israel has maintained a system of socialized health care for all Israelis since its establishment in 1948. A National Health Insurance law was passed in 1995. Coverage includes medical diagnosis and treatment, preventive medicine, hospitalization, surgery and transplants, preventive dental care for children, and other benefits.

The Israeli-Palestinian conflict, however, has been found to have negative impacts on children's health and medical care. A 2007 study found that stress from the violence in years prior has led to sharply increased levels of alcohol consumption, smoking, and substance abuse among Israeli adolescents. It stated, in part, that "Close physical exposure to acts of terrorism was positively associated with higher levels of alcohol consumption, binge drinking, and cannabis that were significant before and after we controlled for PTSS and depression." The study concluded that there is a high risk of future health complications as a result of these behaviors.

The Unit of Emergency Medicine from Schneider Children's Medical Center of Israel performed a two-year research and review surrounding the medical care of child terror victims. The results, which were published in 2003, stated, "During the study period, 41 mass-casualty events (MCEs) were managed by Magen David Adom. Each event involved on average, 32 regular and nine mobile intensive care unit ambulances with 93 medics, 19 paramedics, and four physicians. Evacuation time was 5–10 minutes in urban areas and 15–20 minutes in rural areas. In most cases, victims were evacuated to multiple facilities. To improve efficiency and speed, the Magen David Adom introduced the use of well-trained 'first-responders' and volunteer, off-duty professionals, in addition to 'scoop and run' on-the-scene management." It added that, "Compared to children with non-terrorism-related injuries, the terrorism-related group had a higher rate of surgical interventions, longer hospital stays, and greater needs for rehabilitation services."

Hospitals in southern Israel have been damaged by Qassam rockets from Gaza, and ambulances have been delayed by Palestinians pelting them with rocks. In 2012, a Palestinian man admitted to poisoning a Jewish family, causing two adults and two children to be hospitalized.

Palestinian

Since the 1990s, and especially since the violence associated with the Second Intifada, Israel has created hundreds of permanent roadblocks and checkpoints staffed by Israeli military or border police. While some are between Israel and the West Bank to prevent possible terrorist attacks, as of September 2011 most were within the West Bank, with 522 such permanent and an average of 495 temporary "flying checkpoints". A 2009 United Nations reported stated that the checkpoints were evolving into "a more permanent system of control" reducing the space available for Palestinian growth and movement for the benefit of the increasing Israeli settler population. A 2002 incident of a bomb found in a Red Crescent ambulance increased vigilance regarding those vehicles.

In 2004 psychiatrist Derek Summerfield wrote in an opinion piece in the British Medical Journal that the then-recent Israeli military reoccupation of the West Bank and Gaza divided communities by "checkpoints", put up massive walls like the Israeli West Bank barrier and the Gaza Strip barrier and demolished 60,000 homes. The World Bank estimated that due to these actions Palestinian poverty had tripled in three years with 60% of the population subsisting at poverty level and over half of households eating just one meal daily. The barrier was isolating 97 primary health clinics and 11 hospitals from Palestinian patients. During that time there were 87 cases in which denial of access to medical treatment caused death, including to 30 children, some babies born while women in labor were kept at checkpoints. Summerfield said that Physicians for Human Rights-Israel has criticized the Israel Medical Association for its silence on these issues.

A 2009 The Lancet medical journal report, authored by Dr. Awad Mataria and Dr. Hanan Abdul Rahim, described the healthcare system in the Palestinian territories as "fragmented and incoherent".  Dr. Rahim said there were gaps in care, a low level of post-natal care, and little decline infant mortality rates compared with other Arab countries that had been able to bring them down. The report cited a United Nations' report that stated more than 60 Palestinian women had given birth at Israeli checkpoints and 36 of their babies died as a result. The physicians blamed conditions of military occupation, Palestinian political instability, inconsistent and fragmented foreign aid donor policies and a focus on emergency aid, as opposed to long-term development inside the Palestinian territories. The World Health Organization reports regularly on health care in the "occupied Palestinian territory."

In response to the Summerfield opinion piece, Irwin Mansdorf, a member of Task Force on Medical and Public Health Issues, Scholars for Peace in the Middle East wrote an opinion piece about routine care that Palestinians continue to receive in Israeli hospitals and from Israeli physicians, saying that "Palestinians receive care in Israel that they could not receive in any neighboring Arab country. In the last few months alone nearly 200 Palestinian children who were referred under a joint Israeli–Palestinian programme to treat children with serious medical conditions have already undergone major surgery at Israeli hospitals at no cost to the families. Another 350–400 Palestinian children have undergone free diagnostic testing." Simon M Fellerman also wrote one noting that Saving Children, established by the Peres Center for Peace, enables hundreds of Palestinian children to receive free medical care, in particular cardiac surgery, from Israeli surgeons. In response to the Lancet report, an Israeli government spokesperson said that Palestinians in the territories could receive medical care in Israel itself, noting that 28,000 Palestinians from Gaza had been treated in Israel during the two years covered by the Lancet report.

In 2011, the Israeli Civil Administration's Health Coordinator, Dalia Bassa and the Commander of the IDF's Alpine unit jointly organized a ski trip to Mt. Hermon in northern Israel for Palestinian children diagnosed with cancer. The children, who were accompanied by parents, family members, and Israeli soldiers from the Alpine Unit, are undergoing treatment at the Augusta Victoria hospital in Jerusalem.

Accidents from children playing with Unexploded ordnance is a low-level but recurrent threat to children's health. The majority of incidents involving unexploded ordnance occurred in the Gaza Strip.

"Save A Child's Heart" is a program in which any child with heart problems can receive free medical attention and surgery from select doctors and hospitals within Israel. As of 2009 it had operated on 1000 Palestinian children.

Hadassah Medical Center has reported that organ donations in which the recipient is a Palestinian and the donor an Israeli, or vice versa, are not unusual. In one case a Palestinian from Bethlehem received the kidney of an Israeli. The families of Yoni Jesner, a Jewish teenager, and Ahmed Khatib, a Palestinian boy, donated their organs to children from the opposite sides of the Israeli–Palestinian conflict. Yoni Jesner died in a suicide bombing in 2002, while Ahmed Khatib was killed by IDF gunfire in 2005. In 2002, 16-year-old Israeli Rachel Thaler was killed along with two other teenagers in a suicide bombing. After her death, Thaler's family chose to have her organs donated.

Malnutrition

In a 2003 United Nations report, Special Rapporteur Jean Ziegler reported that over 22 per cent of children under 5 in the Palestinian territories were suffering from malnutrition and 15.6 per cent from acute anaemia." According to the World Bank, food consumption in the Palestinian Territories fell by more than 25 per cent per capita, and food shortages particularly of proteins, were reported. A 2007 Palestinian Central Bureau of Statistics poll of Palestinian children in the West Bank and Gaza found that as a result of poverty about 10 percent of Palestinian children suffer "permanent effects from malnutrition", including especially stunted growth. In 2010 the Danish government sponsored a survey that found that 10 percent of children in Gaza are malnourished.

In April 2011, the Israel Defense Forces spokesperson's office made available to the media comments by the deputy director of the International Committee of the Red Cross in the Gaza Strip, who the IDF reported had said that there is "no humanitarian crisis in Gaza. If you go to the supermarket, there are products. There are restaurants and a nice beach." She further said that problems caused by the blockade were "mainly in maintenance of infrastructure and in access to goods, concrete for example."

The Christian Science Monitor staff writer Dan Murphy interviewed the spokeswoman for the Red Cross, Cecilia Goin, who said the comments were not provided in full context and thus gave the inaccurate impression "that everything was OK" when in fact the situation was still "dire." Murphy, who has been to Gaza, wrote that products in supermarkets and restaurants were "out of reach" for most Gazans. He wrote: "In this context the "no humanitarian crisis" means that people in Gaza aren't starving, which is certainly true. The United Nation's Relief and Works Agency provides aid to most of Gaza's 1.5 million people, and has been allowed to bring in food and medical supplies. The Red Cross and other aid groups are active as well." He also noted that a 2008 United States diplomatic cable released by WikiLeaks stated that "Israeli officials have confirmed to Embassy officials on multiple occasions that they intend to keep the Gazan economy functioning at the lowest level possible consistent with avoiding a humanitarian crisis".

A 2012 report jointly issued by aid organizations Save the Children and Britain's Medical Aid for Palestinians found that 10 percent of Gaza children under five had stunted growth due to malnutrition and that 68 percent of pre-school children and 58 percent of children of school age suffered from anaemia. The report stated that the five-year blockade of Gaza Strip, which has prevented importation of necessary supplies and materials, as well as Israel's Gaza War bombing of infrastructure, has led to water being severely contaminated by fertilizer and human waste. Diseases like typhoid and diarrhea, spread by contaminated water, have doubled in children under the age of 3, which has long-term health implications. Open sewage is a problem and in 2012 three children drowned in pools of it.

In October 2012 an Israeli human rights group forced Israel to disclose a 2008 document that calculated that Gaza's 1.5 million inhabitants needed 2,279 calories per person a day to avoid malnutrition and widespread starvation. The Israeli military disputes critics' claims it used the guidelines during its blockade of Gaza to restrict food shipments to Gaza in order to put pressure on Hamas.

Post-traumatic stress

Researchers are finding high levels of post-traumatic stress disorder among Palestinian children. According to some researchers, the average rate of post-traumatic stress disorder among children from both sides of the Green Line is about 70 per cent. Gaza Community Health Programs carried out a study and found that Post Traumatic Stress Disorder (PTSD) rate for children in Gaza was that 54% suffered from severe PTSD, 33.5% from moderate and 11% from mild and doubtful levels of PTSD. In a report, published in the Canadian Journal of Psychiatry, it was estimated that the rate of psychological morbidity in the southern region of Bethlehem in the West Bank, to be 42.3% among Palestinian children. The rate was 46.3% for boys and 37.8% for girls. These rates, the study reported, were twice the rate of psychological morbidity in the Gaza strip.

According to some reports, more than 370,000 Palestinian children have been left shell-shocked by 2014 Israeli war on Gaza.

Israeli professor Edward Kaufman has written that widespread PTSD among Israeli children is caused by "the environment of fear resulting from indiscriminate acts of terror." According to an Israeli child psychiatrist, about half of the children in Jerusalem, the city hit hardest by Palestinian violence, experience symptoms of post-traumatic stress disorder, two to three times higher than the rate of children suffering from other causes of trauma. A recent study by Herzog's trauma centre found that 33 per cent of Israeli youth have been affected personally by terrorism, either by being at the scene of an attack or by knowing someone injured or killed by terrorists. Seventy per cent of those surveyed reported increased subjective fear or hopelessness. Studies have found high levels of PTSD in southern Israel which is frequently attacked by rockets and mortars from the Gaza Strip. In particular, frequent air-raid sirens and explosions of incoming projectiles have caused severe psychological trauma in the city of Sderot.

Media manipulation

Some images of children in the conflict have been shown to be false, digitally altered, or outdated, and are used to manipulate public sentiment.

During the March 2012 Gaza–Israel clashes, Khulood Badawi, an Information and Media Coordinator for the United Nations Office for the Coordination of Humanitarian Affairs, tweeted a picture of a Palestinian child covered in blood. She was criticized because the child was 5-year-old Raja Abu Shaban, who was killed in 2006 when she fell from a swing, and not in an Israeli attack. Badawi later tweeted that she mistakenly had tweeted an old photo. Ma'an News Agency reported the hospital medical report on the dead girl stated she died "due to falling from a high area during the Israeli strike on Gaza". Interviews with relatives, news reports and investigations by human rights organizations also suggest that her death indirectly was caused by an Israeli air strike as little as 100 meters away, though accounts differ on how this occurred. Israeli officials have said that the girl's death had nothing to do with Israel.

One day later, Ofir Gendelman, a spokesman for Israeli Prime Minister Benjamin Netanyahu, tweeted a photo of an Israeli woman and her two children ducking a Gaza rocket describing it as "when a rocket fired by terrorists from Gaza is about to hit their home." When it was proved the photo was from 2009 he said, "I never stated that the photo was current. It illustrates the fear that people in southern Israel live in."

In early November 2012, Israeli activists reported that several journalists with cameras followed a Palestinian girl as she repeatedly tried without success to provoke a violent reaction from Israeli soldiers. On November 18, Alarab Net, an Arab news site, released a photo of three bloodied children and their mother with the caption "martyred massacred family in Gaza". This image turned out to be of Syrian children. Pro-Palestinian activists published a photograph on Twitter of an injured infant held by a rescue worker, writing "even this young injured Palestinian child doesn't seem surprised or scared, used to Israeli terrorism." The baby in the picture was quickly identified as an Israeli injured in a Hamas rocket attack, which also killed her mother. The Washington Post reported at the time on the tendency of both sides in the conflict to politicize photos of injured and dead children.

Peace projects

Many Arab–Israeli peace projects actively involve children and teenagers. For example, Seeds of Peace was founded in 1993 with the goal of creating new generations of leaders in conflict regions that will no longer accept outdated and harmful stereotypes about each other. This would occur by bringing together youth from both sides of conflict regions to literally put a human face on those who were previously perceived as an enemy. The organization, which began with Israeli, Palestinian, and Egyptian teenagers, has expanded to reach Jordan, Morocco, Qatar, Tunisia, Afghanistan, Yemen, India, Pakistan, Maine, Cyprus (Turkish Republic of Northern Cyprus/Republic of Cyprus), and the Balkans.

Children of Peace, a charity based in the United Kingdom, is self-described as focused "upon building alliances with like-minded organisations in the Gaza, Israel, Jordan, Lebanon and the West Bank [establishing] projects and programmes in the arts, education, health and sports for Israeli and Palestinian children, aged 4 – 17." Richard Martin, who founded the organization in 2005, has stated that he refuses to take sides because "all children suffer in conflict."

Middle East Education Through Technology (MEET), the Institute for Circlework, TEC-the Center for Teachnologystrives, and Hand in Hand focus on educational efforts. Hand in Hand is a network of bilingual (Hebrew-Arabic) schools in which Jewish and Arab children study together. It was founded in 1997 by two Israelis, one Arab and one Jewish, with the philosophy of breaking negative stereotypes, cultivating mutual respect and understanding, and providing a dynamic example that Jews and Arabs can study, work and live together in peace.

Hand in Hand has also hosted basketball games organized by PeacePlayers International (PPI) between Israeli and Palestinian teenagers, describing them as "baby steps" towards peace. Ala Khatib, a co-principal, said that "Never mind what is going on outside, whether it's bombing in Gaza or if it's suicide bombing in Tel Aviv, you can't stop school. You have to go to school, you have to face the other side, you have to say good morning, and you have to talk."

In 2005, the United States-based Kabbalah Center and the Palestinian Abu Assukar Center for Peace and Dialogue organized a children's camp for 115 Israeli children and 115 Palestinian children aged 8 to 12 to take place near Tel Aviv at the Ramat Gan Safari Park. The camp, which lasted for four days, involved children from Bethlehem, Ramallah, East Jerusalem, Tulkarem, Jericho, and Jenin. The Israeli children involved were mostly those who came from severe poverty and violent backgrounds. Joint-organizer Osnat Youdkevitch remarked that, "Our message is that of dignity for all human beings. It's harder for adults to fully understand, since so much has already been built up around us, but kids have the chance to grow up thinking in a healthier way. If you play, eat and sweat for four days with a group of other kids who are supposed to be the 'enemy', it will stay in your heart forever."

Mifalot is an organization founded by the owners of Hapoel Tel Aviv Football Club to promote peaceful coexistence through football. In 2013, a football match was held in Holon, bringing together Palestinian and Israeli teenagers. However, Fatah activists posted threatening messages on the Internet against the Palestinian boys and girls who participated in the tournament, and Fatah leaders in Ramallah condemned their participation in such events.

See also
 Civilian casualties in the Second Intifada
 List of Israeli civilian casualties in the Second Intifada
 List of Palestinian civilian casualties in the Second Intifada
 Violence in the Israeli–Palestinian conflict
 Children in emergencies and conflicts

References

Citations

Sources

Israeli–Palestinian conflict
War crimes in Israel
Palestinian terrorism
Children in war